Arsenal Football Club, an association football club based in Islington, London, was founded in 1886 as Dial Square. They became the first southern member admitted into the Football League in 1893, having spent their first four seasons solely participating in cup tournaments and friendlies. The club's name, which shortly changed to Woolwich Arsenal, was shortened to Arsenal in 1914, a year after moving to Highbury. Despite finishing fifth in the Second Division in 1914–15, Arsenal rejoined the First Division at the expense of local rivals Tottenham Hotspur when football resumed after the First World War. Since that time, they have not fallen below the first tier of the English football league system and hold the record for the longest uninterrupted period in the top flight. The club's first team has competed in numerous nationally and internationally organised competitions, and all players who have played in 100 or more such matches are listed below.

David O'Leary holds the record for the greatest number of appearances for Arsenal.  Between 1975 and 1993 the Irish defender played 722 times for the club. As of 2009, seven other players have made more than 500 appearances for Arsenal, including four of the so-called "famous five" defenders of the 1990s, Tony Adams, Lee Dixon, David Seaman and Nigel Winterburn.  The club's goalscoring record is held by Thierry Henry, who scored 228 goals in all competitions between 1999 and 2007 and during a loan spell with the club in 2012. He surpassed the previous record of 185 goals, held by Ian Wright, in 2005, and became the first player to score 200 goals for Arsenal the following year.

In 2013, Arsenal launched the "100 Club" to formally recognise retired players with over 100 league appearances. As of September 2016, 75 living players have been inducted with a further 26 automatically enrolled once they end their careers.

Key
The list is ordered first by date of debut, and then if necessary in alphabetical order.
Appearances as a substitute are included. This feature of the game was introduced in the Football League at the start of the 1965–66 season.
Statistics are correct up to and including the match played on 19 March 2023. Where a player left the club permanently after this date, his statistics are updated to his date of leaving.

Players

Players highlighted in bold are still actively playing at Arsenal.

Captains 
64 players have captained Arsenal since it was founded as Dial Square F.C. in 1886, the first being club founder David Danskin, who captained the team until he was forced to retire due to injury in 1889. The club's longest-serving captain is Tony Adams, who captained the club for 14 years between 1988–2002, and is frequently known as "Mr. Arsenal" for this achievement. The current captain is Martin Ødegaard.

Notes

References
General

Specific

 
Arsenal F.C. players
Players
Association football player non-biographical articles